Julius Amatus Roeting (13 September 1822, in Dresden – 21 May 1896, in Düsseldorf) was a German painter.

Biography 
He displayed artistic talent while still very young and, at the age of twelve, helped create a painting of a lion on a local theater curtain. He began his formal art studies at the Kunstakademie Dresden with Eduard Bendemann then, in 1849, moved to Düsseldorf, where he took over a painting class from the retiring Theodor Hildebrandt at the Kunstakademie Düsseldorf. In 1868, he was named a professor, to replace the late Karl Ferdinand Sohn.

During these years, he travelled extensively. He visited Krefeld in 1854, where he met and married his wife, Maria. The following year, he spent some time in Paris with Ludwig Knaus, then went on to London to paint several portraits, including one of Lord Cranworth, but left before completing his commissions, citing homesickness.

In 1855, he was awarded the Order of St. Michael by King Maximilian II of Bavaria and, in 1877, received the Order of the Red Eagle.

Although he created numerous historical scenes, religious and profane, he became best known for his masculine portraits, including Emanuel Leutze, Wilhelm von Schadow, Carl Friedrich Lessing and Ernst Moritz Arndt. He was a member of the Prussian Academy of Arts and the Vienna Academy of Arts, as well as the "Malkasten", a local society in Düsseldorf. The painter Max Volkhart was his son-in-law.

He died after a short illness (probably pneumonia) leaving several portraits unfinished.

Notable students 

 Ernst Anders
 Friedrich Bindewald
 Arthur Kampf
 Hermann Knackfuß
 August Lemmer
 Otto Modersohn
 
 
 Frederick Vezin
 Max Volkhart

Sources 
 Thieme-Becker, Vols. 27/28: Piermaria to Rosa. E.A. Seemann, Leipzig 1999, Pg.505.

External links 

1822 births
1896 deaths
Academic staff of Kunstakademie Düsseldorf
Artists from Dresden
19th-century German painters
19th-century German male artists
German portrait painters